Ludwik Zejszner born  Ludwig Zeuschner (c. 1805 – 3 January 1871) was a Prussian geologist, paleontologist and mineralogist. He is considered a pioneer of cartographic approaches to geology. He taught mineralogy at Warsaw and was a specialist on the Tatra Mountains in the Carpathians where he was also involved in conservation.

Zeuschner was born in Warsaw in a family of chemists of German descent who had settled in Skwierzyna, near Poznań and served in the court of Poniatowski. He graduated in 1822 from a Warsaw Lycaeum and went to the University of Warsaw. In 1824 he went to Berlin, attending lectures in Göttingen and Heidelberg as well including those of Humboldt and Hegel. He received a doctorate in 1829 from Heidelberg with a dissertation on chemical mixtures in crystallization. Returning to Poland he took the Polish form of his surname Zejszner and joined the newly formed Mineralogy Department at the Jagiellonian University, working there until 1833 when he was dismissed during the November Uprising. He became a mines director at Krakow serving until 1837 and returned in 1848 to the Jagiellonian University. He was employed by the Warsaw Government geological department for which he made explorations and geological maps. From 1829–1856 he was involved in research in the Tatra Mountains and produced numerous research papers. In 1849 he visited Vistula and Barania Góra. Shortly after the fall of Krakow, he was murdered but the motive was never clear but was possibly political. He was buried in Rakowicki Cemetery.

A major publication was a textbook on mineralogy, but his landmark work was the geological map of the Świętokrzyskie Mountains made in 9 sheets and Paleontologia Polska (1846). He noted former glacial cover in the Tatra mountains, explored hot springs in the area,

References

External links 
 Palaeontologia Polska : Opis zoologiczny, botaniczny i geologiczny wszystkich zwierząt i roślin skamienałych polskich. I (1845)

1805 births
1871 deaths
University of Warsaw alumni
Academic staff of Jagiellonian University
Polish geologists
Polish geographers
Burials at Rakowicki Cemetery
19th-century murders in Poland
1871 murders in Europe